Jaruapur  is a village in Panna district of Madhya Pradesh state of India.

References

Villages in Panna district